Duc du Maine (along with the Aurore) was a slave ship that  on June 6, 1719 brought the first African slaves to Louisiana. She had carried them from Senegambia.

Voyages
The ship could carry 500 to 600 slaves. Several voyages have been documented in the Trans Atlantic Slave Database.

First voyage
The first documented slave voyage (Voyage 32884) was in 1719 under Capt. de Lauduoine. began at Port Louis, France. Slaves were purchased at Whydah, and landed at Biloxi. Other sources state that after three months at sea, the first landing occurred at Dauphin Island with 250 slaves. The voyage ended in Lorient, France.

Second voyage
The second voyage, (Voyage 32851), under Capt. N. Roseau with 349 slaves, arrived in March 1721. The voyage also began in France, but the slaves were purchased in the Bight of Benin, and disembarked on the Gulf Coast.

Third voyage
The third voyage (Voyage 33116) under Capt. A. de Lavigne carried slaves from 	
West Central Africa and St. Helena to Martinique, arriving Jan. 14, 1727. Of 491 slaves, 431 were alive to disembark at Martinique; 42 out of 91 crew members died en route.

See also
Aurore (slave ship)
Gypsies

References

Further reading
 Mettas, Jean,  Répertoire des Expéditions Négrières Françaises au XVIIIe Siècle; Tome 2, Ports Autres que Nantes (Paris, 1984), édité par Serge et Michelle Daget.
 Le Tréhour, Nolwenn, “La traite des Noirs lorientaise au temps de la Compagnie des Indes (1720-1770),” MA dissertation (Université de Bretagne-Sud, 1999), p. 197, 206, 216

Slave ships
Sailing ships
Beninese-American history
Togolese-American history
Gambian-American history
Senegalese-American history
Frigates
Ships built in France
18th century in Martinique
1700s ships
History of slavery in Louisiana
Louisiana (New France)
1710s in New France
1719 in North America
First arrivals in the United States